British Strong Style was a professional wrestling stable made up of Pete Dunne, Trent Seven and Tyler Bate, best known for their tenure together in WWE. Dunne currently competes on the SmackDown brand (now under the ring name "Butch") and Bate competes on the NXT brand. Seven last worked for WWE in the NXT UK brand, before his release in August, 2022. Dunne and Seven formed the group in the Progress Wrestling (Progress) promotion in July 2016 as a tag team, before adding Bate, who had been Seven's tag team partner as part of Moustache Mountain since April 2015, in November 2016. The group dominated Progress over the following year with Dunne holding the Progress World Championship and Bate and Seven the Progress Tag Team Championship. Though primarily appearing in Progress, the stable has also worked for several other promotions in the United Kingdom, including Chikara, where they won the 2017 King of Trios tournament.

Through a partnership between Progress and WWE, all three members of British Strong Style have also appeared for WWE since 2017, with Bate defeating Dunne in the finals of the first United Kingdom Championship Tournament to become the inaugural WWE United Kingdom Champion. Dunne won the title from Bate later that year. During Dunne's UK Title reign, Seven and Bate were NXT Tag Team Champions  for a short time in June 2018, making all three members champions in WWE for a short period.

The group takes its name from a style of professional wrestling that is a mixture of Japanese strong style and traditional British catch wrestling. The three have been a prominent part of the NXT UK roster since its creation, and were central figures of the NXT UK programme when it premiered in October 2018; They are nicknamed "the founding fathers of NXT UK" by WWE, due to their crucial part in the creation and growth of the brand.

History

Progress Wrestling (2016–2019)

On 31 July 2016, the Dunne Brothers (Damian Dunne and Pete Dunne) were set to take on Moustache Mountain (Trent Seven and Tyler Bate) at Progress Wrestling's event in London, England. The match ended with Pete and Seven turning on their partners and walking off together, signaling the start of a new partnership, which they subsequently dubbed "British Strong Style". On 25 September, Dunne and Seven defeated the London Riots (James Davis and Rob Lynch) for the Progress Tag Team Championship. On 27 November, Dunne and Seven took part in a seven-man elimination match for the vacant Progress World Championship. The match came down to Dunne, Seven and Jimmy Havoc. After Havoc managed to eliminate Seven from the match, he was attacked by both Seven and Dunne, which brought out Tyler Bate, seemingly to exact revenge on Seven. Bate, however, turned on Havoc, helping Dunne become the new Progress World Champion and turning British Strong Style into a trio. Bate and Dunne were positioned as the spotlight wrestlers of the group, while Seven became its mouthpiece.

After capturing the Progress World Championship, Dunne attempted to pass his half of the Progress Tag Team Championship to Bate, which led to Progress management stripping British Strong Style of the tag team title. They did however allow Bate and Seven to wrestle for the vacant title, leading to a match on 30 December, where the two defeated the London Riots and LDRS (Marty Scurll and Zack Sabre Jr.) to become the new champions.

In January 2017, all three members of British Strong Style took part in a tournament held by WWE to crown the inaugural WWE United Kingdom Championship. The trio were not acknowledged by WWE, instead Bate and Seven were referred to by the Moustache Mountain name, with Dunne being positioned opposite the two as the main villain of the tournament. The tournament eventually came down to Bate and Dunne in the finals with Bate emerging victorious to become the first WWE United Kingdom Champion. After a four-month reign, Bate lost the title to Dunne at NXT TakeOver: Chicago. While WWE did not recognize British Strong Style as a stable, the WWE United Kingdom Championship was entered into storylines involving the group in Progress. The trio's participation in the tournament was also added to their villainous act in Progress with the members wearing NXT jackets, playing up the fact that they were under WWE contracts and promising they were going to leave Progress with the promotion's two championships.

On 23 April, British Strong Style faced off against the Ringkampf stable of Axel Dieter Jr., Timothy Thatcher and Walter from the German Westside Xtreme Wrestling (wXw) promotion in a six-man tag team match, where both of their Progress titles were on the line. The match ended with Seven pinning Walter for the win, meaning that British Strong Style continued both of their title reigns. The following month, British Strong Style found themselves new rivals in the #CCK stable of Chris Brookes, Kid Lykos and Travis Banks, who debuted by interrupting their attack on Matt Riddle. This led to a match on 25 June, where Bate and Seven lost the Progress Tag Team Championship to Brookes and Lykos. On 9 July, British Strong Style and #CCK faced off in a six-man tag team match, where Brookes and Lykos agreed to put the Progress Tag Team Championship on the line with the added stipulation that if British Strong Style did not win the match, they could never again challenge for the title. British Strong Style ended up cheating their way to a victory, making Bate and Seven the new Progress Tag Team Champions.

On 10 September, British Strong Style lost both of their Progress titles to members of #CCK with Bate and Seven losing the Tag Team Championship to Brookes and Lykos in a ladder match, while Dunne lost the World Championship to Travis Banks, ending the group's ten-month domination over Progress. Following the loss of their titles, British Strong Style turned face with Dunne apologising for some of his actions as champion. At Chapter 76, Seven defeated Doug Williams to win the Progress Atlas Championship. At Chapter 82, a rematch of the WWE United Kingdom Championship match from NXT TakeOver: Chicago between Dunne and Bate was the main event. Dunne defeated Bate in what ring announcer and co-owner Jim Smallman said was the duos farewell match, implying both seemingly were going full-time with NXT UK and WWE.

Chikara (2017)
On 1 September 2017, British Strong Style, billed as "House Strong Style", entered the 2017 King of Trios tournament, hosted by the American Chikara promotion in Wolverhampton. After defeating House Whitewolf (A-Kid, Adam Chase and Zayas) in their first round match, House Throwbacks (Dasher Hatfield, Mark Angelosetti and Simon Grimm) in the quarterfinals, and House Rot (Frightmare, Hallowicked and Kobald) via forfeit in the semifinals, House Strong Style advanced to the finals of the tournament, where, on 3 September, they defeated House Sendai Girls (Cassandra Miyagi, Dash Chisako and Meiko Satomura) to become the 2017 King of Trios.

WWE (2018–2022)
After Roderick Strong turned on Pete Dunne at NXT TakeOver: New Orleans, Dunne teased a return of the stable in WWE on Instagram days later. In April during WrestleMania Axxess weekend, Bate and Seven lost an NXT Tag Team Championship match to Strong and Kyle O'Reilly. After the match, they were attacked by The Undisputed Era until Dunne made the save, thus reuniting for the first time in WWE. It was later announced that Dunne, Bate and Seven would take on The Undisputed Era on the first night of the second annual United Kingdom Championship Tournament in June 2018.

British Strong Style won their match against The Undisputed Era on 18 June. The following night, Bate and Seven defeated O'Reilly and Strong to win the NXT Tag Team Championship for the first time, whilst Dunne retained his WWE United Kingdom Championship against tournament winner Zack Gibson, meaning that all members of British Strong Style were now champions in WWE. However, Bate and Seven lost the titles back to O'Reilly and Strong two days later. At NXT TakeOver: Brooklyn 4, Bate and Seven failed to regain their titles against The Undisputed Era while Dunne retained his title against Gibson once again. The group disbanded in late July 2022 after Seven was released from his WWE contract.

Championships and accomplishments

Attack! Pro Wrestling
Attack! 24/7 Championship (2 times) – Bate (1), Dunne (1)
Attack! Tag Team Championship (1 time) – Bate and Seven
Chikara
Chikara Campeonatos de Parejas (1 time) – Bate and Seven
King of Trios (2017) - Bate, Dunne and Seven
Destiny World Wrestling
DWW Championship (1 time) – Dunne
Fight Club:Pro
FCP Championship (1 time) – Dunne
FCP Tag Team Championship (2 time) – Bate and Seven
FutureShock Wrestling
FSW Adrenaline Championship (1 time) – Dunne
Insane Championship Wrestling
ICW World Heavyweight Championship (1 time) – Seven
International Wrestling Syndicate
IWS World Tag Team Championship (1 time) – Bate and Seven
Kamikaze Pro
Relentless Division Championship (1 time) – Bate
Over the Top Wrestling
OTT No Limits Championship (1 time) – Dunne
OTT Tag Team Championship (1 time) – Bate, Dunne and Seven (1), Dunne and Seven (1)
Pro Wrestling Revolver
PWR Tag Team Championship (1 time) - Dunne with Millie McKenzie
Progress Wrestling
Progress Tag Team Championship (3 times) – Dunne and Seven (1), Bate and Seven (2)
Progress World Championship (1 time) – Dunne
Progress Atlas Championship (1 time) - Seven
Pro Wrestling Illustrated
Ranked Dunne No. 29 of the top 500 singles wrestlers in the PWI 500 in 2017
Ranked Bate No. 50 of the top 500 singles wrestlers in the PWI 500 in 2017
Ranked Seven No. 168 of the top 500 singles wrestlers in the PWI 500 in 2018
Revolution Pro Wrestling
RPW Undisputed British Tag Team Championship (1 time) – Bate and Seven
VII Pro Wrestling
VII Pro Championship (1 time) – Dunne
Westside Xtreme Wrestling
wXw Shotgun Championship (2 times) – Dunne (1), Bate (1)
WWE
NXT Tag Team Championship (2 times) – Bate and Seven (1), Dunne with Matt Riddle (1)
NXT UK Tag Team Championship – Bate and Seven (1 time)
NXT UK Heritage Cup (1 time) – Bate
WWE United Kingdom Championship (2 times) – Bate (1), Dunne (1)
WWE United Kingdom Championship Tournament (2017) – Bate
 Dusty Rhodes Tag Team Classic (2020) – Dunne with Matt Riddle
NXT Tag Team Championship Invitational (2018) – Bate and Seven
NXT Year-End Award (1 time) 
 Match of the Year (2017) – Bate vs Dunne

References

External links

Independent promotions teams and stables
WWE NXT teams and stables